St Mary and St Mercurius Coptic Orthodox Church is the first Coptic Orthodox Church in Wales, at St Mary Street in Risca, Newport, Wales.

It was consecrated in 1992 by Pope Shenouda III in the town of Risca, South Wales, under the official name of St Mary’s and St Abu Saifain’s Coptic Orthodox Church as a parish of the Coptic Orthodox Church. NB: St Abu Saifain meaning "the Double-sworded" in Arabic is another name of Saint Mercurius.

Website : http://www.stphilopateerchurch.co.uk/

Priests

The current priest is Rev. Fr. Father Philopater Wahba, who has a degree in medicine MBBS and was a consultant in orthopaedic surgery in Egypt. During his work, he graduated from the Coptic Orthodox Theological University (three years graduate course) in Cairo and from the Institution of Pastoral Care (two-year course). He was ordained in Egypt in 1996 by Pope Shenouda III, Pope of Alexandria and Patriarch on the Holy See of St Mark, and was given the name Philopater after St. Philopater Mercurius who is also known as St Abu Saifain.

History of the building
The church building was a former Wesleyan Methodist church. Founded in 1837, it was rebuilt on the same site in 1852 and was dedicated to St John. The architect is unknown. The church was designed to seat 600 people. It was later known as "Trinity Methodist Church".

The church is a listed historic building (Grade II) for its well-preserved architectural interest, its unusual slender arcades and especially for its fine decorative frontage.

Description

Exterior
The exterior of the church is of a nonconformist chapel with gable end facade in Romanesque style. Red and beige roughly dressed sandstone with cream ashlar is used to define very decoratively the architectural features; artificial slate roof with ashlar coping. Centre three bays are framed by pilasters and the bracketed antae which continue diagonally to apex surmounted by the short bellcote with embattled cornice.

Interior
Two upper-storey pilasters rising from the doorway cornice separate the 3 windows; these are of equal length, long, round-headed with long nook shafts, simple fluted capitals and an impost band; above the central window is the datestone, a shield under a round-arched hood.

The central entrance breaks forward slightly and has a wide moulded round-arched doorway with voussoirs above and impost band; recessed boarded double doors. Set back to each side are small round-headed windows linking with the continuous impost band. To each side are bays with similar though smaller entrance doorways with similar round-headed windows above and end pilasters completing the vertical composition.

The windows have some decorative glazing incorporating glass in cool colours—predominantly blue, green, mauve. Rendered 5-bay side elevation has round arched windows with chamfered surround separated by pilasters with offset; renewed glazing. Attached rear wing, former Sunday School, retains Welsh slate roof and ventilators.

Interior partly converted to Coptic Orthodox liturgical use. Unusual aisled roof structure, wooden trusses rising from posts set on the very tall slender marbled columns with Corinthian derived capitals, which also support the high round arches of a wooden arcade; painted boarded ceiling. Wide moulded reredos arch and gallery. Rear raked gallery with curved and panelled front; pews on both floors retained. Vestibule has glazed panels to partition and swing doors with quarry glazing incorporating Art Nouveau motifs.

See also
Coptic Orthodox Church of Alexandria
Coptic Orthodox Church in Wales
Copts
Coptic iconography
Coptic language
Coptic music
Coptic abstinence
Patriarch of Alexandria
Pope Shenouda III of Alexandria
British Orthodox Church
Coptic Orthodox Church in Europe
The Holy Synod of the Coptic Orthodox Patriarchate of Alexandria
Oriental Orthodoxy
Egypt

Other Coptic Orthodox churches
Coptic architecture — about Coptic Orthodox Churches
List of Coptic Orthodox Churches in the United States
Saint Mary and Saint Abasikhiron Coptic Orthodox Church, Llandudno, North Wales

Coptic Cairo
Seat of the Coptic Orthodox Pope of Alexandria
Saint Barbara Church in Coptic Cairo
Saint Mark's Coptic Orthodox Cathedral, Cairo
Saint Mark's Coptic Orthodox Cathedral (Alexandria)
Saint Mark's Coptic Orthodox Cathedral (Azbakeya)
Saint Mark Coptic Orthodox Church (Heliopolis)
Saint Mary Church (Haret Elroum)
Saint Mercurius Church in Coptic Cairo
Saints Sergius and Bacchus Church (Abu Serga)
The Hanging Church
Church of the Holy Virgin (Babylon El-Darag)
Church of the Virgin Mary (Haret Zuweila)

References

External links

Christian organizations established in 1992
Mary, Wales
Risca, St Mary and St Mercurius
Oriental Orthodox congregations established in the 20th century
19th-century churches in the United Kingdom